Ian Borrows (born 26 November 1989) is an Australian slalom canoeist who has competed at the international level since 2006.

He won two medals at the Canoe Slalom World Cup in 2009 and 2010 and qualified for the 2016 Summer Olympics in Rio de Janeiro where he finished in 11th place.

His younger sister Alison is also a slalom canoeist.

World Cup individual podiums

1 Oceania Championship counting for World Cup points
2 Asia Canoe Slalom Championship counting for World Cup points

References

1989 births
Living people
Canoeists at the 2016 Summer Olympics
Olympic canoeists of Australia
Australian male canoeists
21st-century Australian people